Henry Bright (baptised 26 October 1562 – 4 March 1627) was a clergyman and schoolmaster in Worcester. He served for 38 years Headmaster at The King's School, Worcester, and is mentioned by Thomas Fuller and Anthony Wood as an exceptional teacher, particularly of Latin, Greek and Hebrew. Many of his pupils are notable for their faculty in Latin and Greek and their impact on  theological matters.

Life
Bright was baptised at the Church of St. Peter the Great in Worcester on 26 October 1562. He was the eldest son of James Bright, son of Nathaniel Bright (1493–1564).

He was probably educated at King's Worcester himself, and matriculated at Brasenose College, Oxford as a "plebeian" in 1580, aged 18. Having moved to Balliol College, Oxford, he graduated B.A. (1584) and M.A. (1587), and was elected to a fellowship at Balliol in 1585.

Starting at King’s Worcester in 1589, he also held a number of preferments in the church, including the rectories of Broadwas (1591), Tredington (1606) and Warndon (1615), and canonries at Hereford Cathedral (1607) and Worcester Cathedral (1619).

In 1609 he purchased the estate of Brockbury in the parish of Colwall, Herefordshire.

He died on 4 March 1627.

Marriages and children
Bright married twice. Firstly he married Maria Tovey, by whom he had a daughter:
 Mary Bright

Secondly he married Joan Berkeley, a daughter of Rowland Berkeley  and a sister of Sir Robert Berkeley , the judge. They had a son and three daughters:
Robert Bright (1617–1665), son and heir
Dorothy Bright
Joyce Bright, who married John Brydges (1604–1669) – they had three daughters, Brydges' coheirs
Catherine Bright

Robert Bright inherited the estate of Brockbury, which remained in the family for many centuries, passing down to Henry Bright  (1784–1869), then to the Oxford historian James Franck Bright (1832–1920).

Epitaph

Bright's wall monument survives in Worcester Cathedral. It carries an epitaph written by Joseph Hall (then Dean of Worcester), and quoted by Fuller as follows:

Arms
 Bright’s arms are blazoned Azure, a fess wavy ermine in chief three crescents argent.

Notable pupils
Bright is principally remembered for the pupils he taught at Worcester whom he frequently sent to Oxford, many of whom became well known. They include:
 John Beale , clergyman and scientific writer, in whom Bright helped develop an interest in Erasmus
 Samuel Butler, a poet and satirist, author of Hudibras
 John Doughtie, Canon of Westminster Abbey, buried in Westminster Abbey
 William Dugard, schoolmaster and publisher, associate of John Milton
 Thomas Good, Master of Balliol College, Oxford
 Thomas Hall, presbyterian minister ejected from the Church of England in 1662
 Robert Harris, President of Trinity College, Oxford
 Roger Maynwaring, Dean of Worcester and Bishop of St David's, chaplain to Charles I
 Thomas Nabbes, dramatist
 Hannibal Potter, President of Trinity College, Oxford
 Francis Potter , Biblical commentator and scientific innovator
 Sir John Vaughan, judge and statesman, Chief Justice of the Common Pleas
 Thomas Warmestry, Dean of Worcester
 Edward Winslow, one of the Pilgrim Fathers, Governor of Plymouth Colony, Massachusetts

Reputation
Thomas Fuller, in his History of the Worthies of England, praised Bright as follows:

For my own part, I behold this Master Bright placed by Divine Providence in this city, in the Marches, that he might equally communicate the lustre of grammar learning to youth both of England and Wales.

Pupils did attend the school from Wales as well as England. Bright arranged for Worcester Cathedral chapter to provide exhibition scholarships of 2 shillings per annum for pupils he sent to university.

His reputation was also echoed by Anthony Wood in his Fasti Oxoniensis:

He had a most excellent faculty in instructing youths in Latin, Greek and Hebrew, most of which were afterwards sent to the universities, where they proved eminent to emulation. He was also an excellent preacher, was resorted to far and near ... The posterity of this Hen. Bright do now live in genteel fashion in Worcestershire.

References
 As the legal year at this time began on 25 March, Bright's death is recorded as having taken place in 1626, but this date is now regarded as falling in 1627. (Full explanation.)

1562 births
1627 deaths
Clergy from Worcester, England
People educated at King's School, Worcester
Alumni of Brasenose College, Oxford
Alumni of Balliol College, Oxford
Fellows of Balliol College, Oxford
Schoolteachers from Worcestershire
17th-century English educators
16th-century English educators